Vookondi is a village and Gram panchayat of Nalgonda mandal, Nalgonda district, in Telangana state, India.

Veteran communist leader Dharma Biksham was born in this village.

Demographics
According to Indian census, 2001, the demographic details of this village is as follows:
 Total Population: 	2,274 in 481 Households.
 Male Population: 	1,178 and Female Population: 	1,096
 Children Under 6-years: 357 (Boys - 184 and Girls - 173)
 Total Literates: 	1,111

References

Villages in Nalgonda district